HTS Middelburg is a public Afrikaans medium co-educational technical high school situated in Middelburg in the Mpumalanga province of South Africa. It is now open to all genders.

Averages 2015

Offered sports
Rugby
Netball
Tennis
Chess
Squash
Skeet shooting
Cross country running
Cricket
Jukskei
Hockey
Golf
Athletics

History
 April 1927 - The eenman-wamakerskool gets moved from Belfast to Middelburg. The principal was Mr. Lampen, and there were 5 students.
 September 1927 - Mr. S.J.H. Mostert becomes principal.
 January 1929 - Mr. J.P. Pretorius becomes principal.
 1930 - The school obtains a total of 65 students.
 12 September 1934 - The Governor General visits the school and declares 2 October a public holiday.
 13 August 1942 - Mr. J.P. Pretorius dies in Madagascar while serving for the S.A.W. (Suid Afrika Weermag) -- South African Army
 18 January 1943 - Mr. J.M. Theron becomes the new principal.
 1 July 1945 - Mr D.G. Smith becomes the new principal.
 21 January 1947 - The school obtains a total of 158 students.
 14 April 1964 - Mr. L.E. Smith becomes the new principal.
 20 January 1965 - The school obtains a total of 545 students.
 16 September 1971 - Mr. Z.L. Benadé becomes the new principal.
 25 January 1972 - The school obtains a total of 735 students.
 28 March 1981 - Mr. J.F.W. Potgieter becomes the new principal.
 6 January 1982 - The first 10 girls are allowed to attend the school.
 January 1987 - The school obtains a total of 1320 students.
 1983 - 8 technical subjects are provided by the school.
 1 January 1994 - Mr. H.J. Miles of Belfast becomes the new principal.
 2001 - Mr. Jonker becomes the new principal.

High schools in South Africa